Nick Barborak is a former Democratic member of the Ohio House of Representatives for the 5th district. Before his election he was Treasurer of Columbiana County, a position he was first appointed to in 2007 after the incumbent was elected to the Ohio House of Representatives. He was subsequently elected to a full term. In November 2011 Barborak announced he would run for the House seat against incumbent Republican Craig Newbold. He defeated Newbold in the election with 50.57% of the vote. Barborak lost re-election in 2014 to Tim Ginter.

Barborak has also served as an assistant prosecutor. He is married and has two children.

Ohio's 5th House District encompasses all of Columbiana County.

References

External links
Campaign website

Living people
Democratic Party members of the Ohio House of Representatives
University of Akron alumni
Kent State University alumni
21st-century American politicians
Year of birth missing (living people)